Yevgeny Grigoryevich Yasin (born 7 May 1934) is a prominent Russian economist. He was the Russian Minister for the Economy between 1994 and 1997. Until July 2021 was an academic supervisor at the National Research University Higher School of Economics. He is a regular contributor to Ekho Moskvy radio.

Biography
Evgeniy Yasin was born on May 7, 1934.

In 1957 he graduated from the Odessa Institute of Civil Construction, and in 1963 from the Lomonosov Moscow State University Faculty of Economics. In 1968 he defended his thesis for the degree of the Candidate of Science. In 1976 - Doctor of Economics, and since 1979 - Professor. From 1958 - 1960 Evgeniy Yasin was an engineer at the Design Institute Number 3 of the Committee of Civil Engineering, Ukrainian SSR. After graduating from MSU, from 1964 - 1973 he worked at the Research Institute of the Central Department of Statistics as head of department and later head of laboratory.

From 1973 - 1989 he headed a laboratory at the Central Institute of Economics and Mathematics, USSR Academy of Sciences.
In 1978 Evgeniy Yasin led a Department on Economic Reform in the State Commission of the USSR Council of Ministers. He was one of the key authors of a number of programmes of the transition to a market economy, including the well-known programme ‘500 days'.
In 1991 he went from the USSR Government Office to the Scientific and Industrial Union of the USSR - today called the Russian Union of Industrialists and Entrepreneurs (Employers) (RSPP) - as Director for Economic Policy. In November 1991 he created the Expert Institute as part of this organization and became its head.

From January 1992 Evgeniy Yasin worked as Director of the RSPP and at the same time was Authorized Representative of the Russian Government in the Supreme Council of the Russian Federation.
In 1993 he was appointed Head of a work group under the Chairman of the Government of the RF and actively participated in the development of economic programmes.In April 1994 he became Head of the Analytical Center under the President of the RF.

In November 1994 Evgeniy Yasin was appointed head of the Ministry of Economic Development of the Russian Federation, and in April 1997  - Minister of the Russian Federation. 

From October 1998 to present - Academic Supervisor of the University - Higher School of Economics, President of the Expert Institute.
Since 2000 - President of the ‘Liberalnaya Missiya' (‘Liberal Mission') Foundation. Its board members include his daughter Irina Yasina, Igor Klyamkin, Alexander Arkhangelsky, Jochen Wermuth, Dmitry Zimin, Georgy Satarov, Lilia Shevtsova et al.

Until September 2009 he was member of the Federal Political Council of the "Union of Rightist Forces", but when President Putin named him member of the Civic Chamber of the Russian Federation he cancelled membership in the party.

Titles
 Academic Supervisor of the Higher School of Economics (HSE)
 President of the ‘Liberalnaya Missiya' (‘Liberal Mission') Foundation
 President of the Scientific Non-Commercial Foundation ‘Expert Institute' (Exin)
 Member of the Russian Federation Public Chamber Commission on Education and Science (2008)
 Member of the European Academy of Sciences
 Honorary Professor at the Jilin University (People's Republic of China)
 Doctor Honoris Causa at the University of Birmingham (Great Britain)
 Chairman of the Dissertation Council on Economic Sciences, HSE
 Professor at the HSE Department of Statistics

References

External links
 homepage of the Higher School of Economics with biography of Yevgeny Yasin
 board homepage  of the ‘Liberal Mission' Foundation
 Yasin board member of RSPP

1934 births
Living people
Writers from Odesa
Russian economists
Economy ministers of Russia
Academic staff of the Moscow Institute of Physics and Technology
Echo of Moscow radio presenters
Academic staff of the Higher School of Economics
Members of the Civic Chamber of the Russian Federation